Jeremy Ashkenas is a computer programmer known for the creation and co-creation of the CoffeeScript and LiveScript programming languages respectively, the Backbone.js JavaScript framework and the Underscore.js JavaScript library. While working in the graphics department at The New York Times, he shared the 2015 Gerald Loeb Award for Images/Graphics/Interactives. After working at the Times, he was an employee of Observable, Inc. As of 2020, he works at Substack Inc. Jeremy returned to The New York Times in June 2022 as Director of Graphics for Opinion.

References

External links 
 CoffeeScript website
 Backbone.js website
 Underscore.js website

Living people
Web developers
American computer programmers
Free software programmers
Programming language designers
Gerald Loeb Award winners for Images, Graphics, Interactives, and Visuals
Year of birth missing (living people)